The Hadramaut himri (Carasobarbus exulatus) is a species of ray-finned fish in the genus Carasobarbus, it is endemic to Yemen where it occurs in Wadi Hadramaut, and possibly Wadi Maran.

References

Carasobarbus
Endemic fauna of Yemen
Freshwater fish of Western Asia
Fish described in 1977